Kudimagan is a 2019 Indian Tamil-language film directed by Sathieshwaran. The film stars Jaikumar, Master Akash, and Nanditha Jennifer in the lead roles.

Cast 
The cast includes:

Production 
Akash Anandan, a 7 year-old anti-TASMAC activist, was chosen to play a role in the film. Scenes involving Akash were shot during after school hours so that Akash would not have to skip school. Jayakumar, the grandson of producer Kalaignanam, made his film debut through this film.

Soundtrack 
Soundtrack was composed by debutant S. M. Prashanth.
"Deivangal Ingillai" – Sriram Parthasarathy
"Ooru Ulagam" – Velmurugan

Release 
The Times of India gave this film two out of five stars saying that "The director drives home his message with TV soap opera-ish filmmaking and the subtlety of a sledgehammer". However, News Today Net wrote "Though there are some flaws, yet the intention of the filmmaker should be appreciated. He has stayed away from commercial cliches to drive home a string message".

References

External links 

Indian drama films
2010s Tamil-language films
Films about social issues in India
2019 films
2019 drama films